Jordan Edward Benjamin (born October 25, 1993), known professionally as Grandson, is a Canadian-American singer, songwriter, and musician currently signed to Fueled by Ramen. He released his major label debut EP, A Modern Tragedy Vol. 1, on June 15, 2018, and released the follow-up  A Modern Tragedy Vol. 2 on February 22, 2019. The initial EP featured the single "Blood // Water", which appeared on several Billboard charts in the United States and Canada. Benjamin's music focuses on modern-day issues that are less recognized by the media and public. On December 4, 2020, he released his debut studio album, Death of an Optimist.

Early life and education

Benjamin was born in New Jersey, United States, but when he was 3 years old his family moved to Toronto, Ontario, where his maternal relatives lived (he holds dual citizenship of both countries). He has two sisters. Benjamin grew up largely in the Eglinton West area of Toronto. He attended Northern Secondary School in Toronto and, after graduation, enrolled in McGill University in Montreal. There, he studied education with the initial goal of becoming a teacher. He also spent a great deal of time DJing and playing shows in Montreal while at McGill. After two years, he transferred to Concordia University, another Montreal institution. He studied communications there briefly before dropping out and moving to Los Angeles in 2014 to pursue a music career.

Career
Benjamin began releasing music under the pseudonym Grandson, stylized as grandson, in late 2015. In 2016, he released several singles that accrued millions of streams, including "Bills", "Things Change", and "Bury Me Face Down". In 2017, he was signed to RCA Records, and continued releasing singles, including "Best Friends" and "Kiss Bang". He also performed at North by Northeast that year (among other festivals).

In April 2018, it was announced that grandson had signed to the Fueled By Ramen record label. He had also released two new singles, "Blood // Water" (a song about political corruption that would go on to appear on multiple Billboard charts) and "Thoughts & Prayers", which offered a critique of American gun laws in the wake of the shooting at Marjory Stoneman Douglas High School in Parkland, Florida. He released his first EP on Fueled by Ramen, A Modern Tragedy Vol. 1, in June 2018. That EP also featured the song "6:00" which discussed police brutality. Also in June 2018, grandson was featured on Mike Shinoda's song "Running from My Shadow", taken from his debut album Post Traumatic; the track was released also with an accompanying music video in May 2018.

Throughout 2018, grandson toured with acts like Hobo Johnson, Joywave, Nothing But Thieves, Smashing Pumpkins, and Young the Giant. He also appeared on an episode of Late Night with Seth Meyers in August 2018, performing "Blood // Water".

In February 2019, he released a new single, "Apologize", and announced his second EP, A Modern Tragedy Vol. 2, which was released on February 22, 2019. In late May, grandson released a cover of Rage Against the Machine's "Maria", a song featured on the 1999 album The Battle of Los Angeles.

In June 2019, he won the SOCAN Songwriting Prize for his song "Blood // Water", while in September 2019 the singer released A Modern Tragedy Vol. 3, the final installment of the Modern Tragedy trilogy EPs; the record features the lead single "Rock Bottom", which peaked at No. 38 on the Canadian Rock Chart.

On September 23, 2020, grandson announced on his Facebook page that his debut full-length album Death of an Optimist would be released on December 4, 2020. Death of an Optimist is grandson's debut album, being his first record to have a heavier tone since the release of the last a modern tragedy EP, a modern tragedy vol. 3. The album gained a lot of publicity and recognition through his social media. He announced a new album in May 2022.

Discography

Studio albums

EPs

Singles

As featured artist

Music videos

Notes

References

External links

Official website

1993 births
21st-century Canadian rappers
Canadian male rappers
Canadian rock musicians
Rappers from New Jersey
Musicians from Toronto
Living people
RCA Records artists
Fueled by Ramen artists
Alternative hip hop musicians
Rap rock musicians
Trap musicians (EDM)
Jewish Canadian musicians
Jewish American musicians
21st-century American male musicians